Dinara Safina was the defending champion, but lost in the second round to Aravane Rezaï.

Elena Dementieva won in the final, 6–4, 6–3, against Maria Sharapova.

Seeds
The top eight seeds receive a bye into the second round.

  Dinara Safina (second round)
  Serena Williams (semifinals)
  Venus Williams (second round)
  Elena Dementieva (champion)
  Jelena Janković (quarterfinals)
  Svetlana Kuznetsova (second round)
  Vera Zvonareva (third round)
  Caroline Wozniacki (second round)
  Victoria Azarenka (second round)
  Nadia Petrova (first round)
  Ana Ivanovic (second round)
  Flavia Pennetta (second round)
  Marion Bartoli (first round)
  Agnieszka Radwańska (quarterfinals)
  Amélie Mauresmo (first round)
  Dominika Cibulková (second round)

Main draw

Finals

Top half

Section 1

Section 2

Bottom half

Section 3

Section 4

References

External links
 Official results archive (ITF)
 Official results archive (WTA)

Cup - Singles
Rogers